Mauno Johannes Kurppa (22 June 1927, in Loimaa – 30 January 1999) was a Finnish farmer, business executive and politician. He was a member of the Parliament of Finland, representing the Finnish Rural Party (SMP) from 1970 to 1972 and the Finnish People's Unity Party (SKYP) from 1972 to 1975.

References

1927 births
1999 deaths
People from Loimaa
Finnish Rural Party politicians
Finnish People's Unity Party politicians
Members of the Parliament of Finland (1970–72)
Members of the Parliament of Finland (1972–75)